Tatsuo Endo may refer to:

, Japanese actor
, Japanese engineer